Sylvania Electric Products Inc. was an American manufacturer of diverse electrical equipment, including at various times radio transceivers, vacuum tubes, semiconductors, and mainframe computers such as MOBIDIC. They were one of the companies involved in the development of the COBOL programming language.

History 

The Hygrade Sylvania Corporation was formed when NILCO, Sylvania and Hygrade Lamp Company merged into one company in 1931.

In 1939, Hygrade Sylvania started preliminary research on fluorescent technology, and later that year, demonstrated the first linear, or tubular, fluorescent lamp. It was featured at the 1939 New York World's Fair. Sylvania was also a manufacturer of both vacuum tubes and transistors. In 1942, the company changed its name to Sylvania Electric Products Inc.

During World War II, Sylvania was chosen from among several competing companies to manufacture the miniature vacuum tubes used in proximity fuze shells due to its quality standards and mass production capabilities.

In 1959, Sylvania Electronics merged with General Telephone to form General Telephone and Electronics (GTE).

Sylvania developed the earliest flash cubes for still cameras, later selling the technology to Eastman Kodak Company, and later a 10-flash unit called FlipFlash, as well as a line of household electric light bulbs, which continued during GTE's ownership and today is sold by Osram Sylvania.

In June 1964, Sylvania unveiled a color TV picture tube in which europium-bearing phosphor was used for a much brighter, truer red than was possible before.

Through merger and acquisitions, the company became a significant, but never dominating supplier of electrical distribution equipment, including transformers and switchgear, residential and commercial load centers and breakers, pushbuttons, indicator lights, and other hard-wired devices. All were manufactured and distributed under the brand name GTE Sylvania, with the name Challenger used for its light commercial and residential product lines. GTE Sylvania contributed to the technological advancement of electrical distribution products in the late 1970s with several interesting product features.  At the time, they were the leading supplier of vacuum cast coil transformers, manufactured in their Hampton, Virginia plant. Their transformers featured aluminum primary winding and were cast using relatively inexpensive molds, allowing them to produce cast coil transformers in a variety of KVA capacities, primary and secondary voltages and physical coil sizes, including low profile coils for mining and other specialty applications. They also developed the first medium voltage 3 phase panel that could survive a dead short across two phases. Their patented design used bus bar encapsulated in a thin coating of epoxy and then bolted together across all three phases, using special non-conductive fittings.

By 1981 GTE had made the decision to exit the electrical distribution equipment market and began selling off its product lines and manufacturing facilities. The Challenger line, mostly manufactured at the time in Jackson, Mississippi, was sold to a former officer of GTE, who used the Challenger name as the name of his new company. Challenger flourished, and was eventually sold to Westinghouse, and later Eaton Corporation. By the mid-1980s, the GTE Sylvania electrical equipment product line and name was no more.

In 1993 GTE exited the lighting business to concentrate on its core telecomms operations. The European, Asian and Latin American operations are now under the ownership of Havells Sylvania.
With the acquisition of the North American division by Osram GmbH in January 1993 Osram Sylvania Inc. was established.

Brand name 

In the early 1980s, GTE Sylvania sold the rights to the name Sylvania and Philco for use on consumer electronics equipment only, to the Netherlands' NV Philips. This marked the end of Sylvania's TV production in Batavia, New York, USA, and Smithfield, North Carolina, USA. The Sylvania Smithfield plant later became Channel Master.
The rights to the Sylvania name in many countries are held by the U.S. subsidiary of the German company Osram.
The Sylvania brand name is owned worldwide, apart from Australia, Canada, Mexico, Thailand, New Zealand, Puerto Rico and the USA, by Havells Sylvania, headquartered in London.

Osram Sylvania 
Osram Sylvania manufactures and markets a wide range of lighting products for homes, business, and vehicles and holds a leading share of the North American lighting market [2].
In fiscal year 2008, the company achieved sales of about 1.75 billion euros, which comprised about 38% of Osram's total sales at the time.
Osram's worldwide lighting businesses employed about 9,000 people at the time. In 2016, Osram spun off the general lighting business which included the North American Osram Sylvania unit into an independent company called LEDVANCE headquartered in Garching, Germany. In 2017, LEDVANCE was merged into a consortium of Chinese investment companies and the Chinese lighting manufacturer MLS under the LEDVANCE name. The North American headquarters of LEDVANCE, previously referred to as Osram Sylvania, and located in Danvers, Massachusetts, was relocated to Wilmington, Massachusetts in 2015, a town north of Boston, MA. LEDVANCE continues to use the well known Osram and Sylvania brand names in their corresponding and representative markets throughout the world.

Advertising 

 From 1951 until 1956, Sylvania sponsored the game show Beat the Clock. The grand prizes on the show would be Sylvania television sets, and some consolation prizes would be Sylvania radios. Sylvania "Blue Dot (tm) for sure shot" flashbulbs would be used to take a photograph of the contestants in awkward outfits or messy stunts.
 One of Sylvania's heavily advertised TV features was a lighted perimeter mask of adjustable brightness called "HALOLIGHT", which was purported to ease the optical transition if a viewer glanced from a dark background to the bright TV screen. Today Philips markets an Ambilight feature, lighting the wall behind a flat display to soften the viewing experience. HALOLIGHT could not be adapted for color TV, because color TV white balance (aka tracking from low to high brightness) was unpredictable. Since the white color temperature of the HALOLIGHT and the illuminated color screen could not be made equivalent, HALOLIGHT was withdrawn.
 Osram Sylvania sponsored the It's a Small World ride at Disneyland in California with a twelve-year agreement starting in 2009. In 2014, the sponsor logo at the attraction's entrance changed to that of Siemens, the parent company of Sylvania.

Accidents 
The Sylvania Electric Products explosion, which involved scrap thorium, occurred on July 2, 1956, at their facility in Bayside, Queens, New York City. The incident injured nine people; one employee subsequently died of his injuries.

References

External links 
 LEDVANCE Sylvania General Lighting site
 Feilo Sylvania Group web site

Defunct manufacturing companies of the United States
Defunct semiconductor companies of the United States
Guitar amplification tubes
Siemens
Vacuum tubes
Academy Award for Technical Achievement winners